The following lists events that happened during 2009 in Ethiopia.

Incumbents
President: Girma Wolde-Giorgis
Prime Minister: Meles Zenawi

Events

January
January 2 – Ethiopia begins withdrawing troops from Somalia after two years of intervention in the civil war.

References

 
2000s in Ethiopia
Years of the 21st century in Ethiopia
Ethiopia
Ethiopia